Mai Đức Chung (born June 21, 1949) is a former Vietnamese football player and coach, currently the head coach of the Vietnam women's national football team.

Playing career
Mai Duc Chung is a versatile player who can play in many positions. His forte position is midfielder or striker, but when needed, he can also play in the position of defender. During his peak, he was nicknamed "Chung athletics" due to his ability to run tirelessly.
Starting his career as a player, he received many offers from clubs at that time such as the Tổng cục Đường sắt, Công an Hà Nội... However, he accepted the offer to play for a club at a lower level known as Xe ca Hà Nội (which is also the reason behind the nickname Chung "xe ca").
In September 1975, he accepted to play for the Tổng cục Đường sắt and stayed with this club until he retired. Together with the General Department of Railways, he won the first national championship in 1980. He was called up to the national team (1981–82) to compete abroad. Mai Duc Chung retired from football in 1984.

Managerial and coaching career

Vietnam national youth teams
For a long time, Mai Duc Chung held the position of No. 1 assistant to coach Alfred Riedl in the men's national football team. In 2007, when Mr. Alfred Riedl was absent because he had to undergo kidney transplant surgery, he took charge of the Vietnam Olympic football team and won a number of important victories against West Asian rivals such as Lebanon and Oman in the 2008 Beijing Olympic qualifiers. In the final round of the Olympic qualifying round, head coach Riedl gave him the right to direct the Olympic team for the last 3 matches.

After the semi-final match at the 2007 Southeast Asian Games against Myanmar U-23s, VFF fired Alfred Riedl, he was appointed to lead the Vietnam U-23 team to the bronze medal match with the Singapore U-23 team. but U-23 Vietnam lost 0–5. This is also the record failure of the Vietnam U-23 team.

In 2008, VFF appointed him as head coach of Vietnam U-22. In October 2008, he led the Vietnam national U-22 football team to win the 2008 Merdeka Cup in Malaysia (drawn with the Malaysian national team 0-0 after 2 extra time and won 6-5 by 11m kick).

Becamex Binh Duong
In May 2009, after the change of head coach at the defending national champion club Binh Duong, he was suddenly invited to the position of head coach of the club. His outstanding achievement during his time in charge of Binh Duong was reaching the semi-finals of the 2009 AFC Cup; This is the best achievement to date by a Vietnamese football club in the continental playground. At the end of the 2009 V-League, Binh Duong won the second place and was the team that scored the most goals.

In April 2010, after 8 rounds of V-League 2010, the leadership of Becamex Binh Duong was not satisfied with the 4th place and the results that Binh Duong had achieved, so he fired him.

In 2015, he was invited by Becamex Binh Duong in the middle of the season to replace his predecessor Le Thuy Hai in the role of technical director of the team. Under his guidance, Becamex Binh Duong quickly regained its identity after the defeats from the beginning of the season and at the 2015 AFC Champions League to successfully defend the V.League championship and win the 2015 National Cup for the first time.

Navibank Saigon
Shortly after being fired by Becamex Binh Duong, he became a coach for Navibank Saigon team. Under his guidance, Navibank Saigon won the 2011 National Cup championship. At the end of January 2012, he was appointed as the head coach of the Vietnam national U-19 team.

Thanh Hoa
In early February 2013, he officially became the head coach of Thanh Hoa club after the club suddenly terminated the contract with coach Trieu Quang Ha. During his time here, he was entangled in controversies surrounding a clash with a Dong Tam Long An fan after the 0–2 loss to Dong Tam Long An away in the 2014 V.League season. Disagreeing with the club's leaders on a contract issue, coach Mai Duc Chung decided to part ways with the Thanh team when the 2014 season had only 3 rounds left to end, coincidentally with Mr. Chung's return to the national women team.

Vietnam women team
Mai Duc Chung was the first head coach of the Vietnamese women's national team in 1997, with the first success being the SEA Games gold medal and the SEA Games bronze medal the same year. He and the team won two more SEA Games gold medals in 2003 and 2005 before taking a long break from leading the women's team.

In 2014, in order to prepare for the women's team to attend ASIAD, VFF invited Mr. Chung to recruit, even though he had intended to hire a Japanese coach before and had at least two candidates selected. The Vietnamese women's team led by him at the congress caused a sensation when it first appeared in the semi-finals of an ASIAD. His subsequent successes with the women's team include three gold medals in women's football at the 2017, 2019 and 2021 Southeast Asian Games, and one win at the AFF Cup 2019. At the SEA Games alone, He has contributed to five of the seven gold medals of Vietnamese women's football at the moment.

However, the peak of Mr. Chung's career with the national women's football team came in early 2022. After a series of play-offs that decided the 6th place to attend the World Cup 2023 at the Asian Cup 2022, the Vietnamese women's team under his guidance has won the only ticket to the World Cup. This is the first time in history that a Vietnamese national football team in general and a women's team in particular have participated in a senior World Cup tournament. More importantly, this achievement comes when his team has suffered many great losses in terms of force in the period before and throughout the tournament due to the effects of the COVID-19 pandemic.

After achieving unprecedented achievements with the women's team, Mai Duc Chung suddenly expressed his wish to not lead the team anymore and won't take part in the upcoming 2023 World Cup. At the time of his withdrawal, he was over 70 years old and considered himself unfit to be under pressure at every important match or tournament. At the 31st SEA Games, he once again helped the women's team win the gold medal when defeating Thailand 1–0 at home.

Vietnam men team
In 2017, after Nguyen Huu Thang resigned as the head coach of the national men's football team due to the team's elimination immediately after the group stage of men's football at the Southeast Asian Games, the Vietnam Football Federation asked him to be the interim coach to lead the men's team to play the 2019 AFC Asian Cup qualifying round. This is the second time he accepted the job as the interim coach of the national men's football team after his predecessors were banned. dismissal or resign. He helped the team win both Asian Cup qualifying matches when meeting Cambodia at home and away, thereby bringing the team from 3rd place to 2nd in the group, but with equal points and only goal difference. won over the top team at this time, Jordan. Then when the VFF voted for the title of head coach of the Vietnamese national football team before the second leg against Cambodia, Mr. Park Hang-seo was elected, so he returned to the coach of the women's national team.

Personal life
Mai Duc Chung was born in Ngoc Ha flower village, Hanoi, but his original hometown is Hung Yen. His birth year was 1951, but many of his peers said he was born in 1949. He was the second child in a family of six sisters. As a child, he often got tickets to the field to watch football thanks to his mother working at Hang Day Stadium. The matches here, especially the confrontations of the North Vietnamese team with the teams of the socialist bloc such as China PR, DPR Korea, Mongolia, etc., have aroused the passion for football in him early on. In 1964, Mr. Chung entered the preparatory class of Tu Son University of Physical Education and Sports, and graduated in 1972.

Mai Duc Chung married Mrs. Pham Thi Ngoc Uyen (born in 1952), a primary school teacher, in 1977. The two have two sons together, one of whom is Mai Quang Hung (born in 1981), former Vietnam U-19 player after became star players of Vietnam national team, such as Duong Hong Son, Huy Hoang, Viet Thang, etc.

References

External links 

1951 births
Living people
Vietnamese football managers
Sportspeople from Hanoi
Vietnamese footballers
Vietnam women's national football team managers